Yozola Glacier is the 5 km long and 1.7 km wide glacier in the Sofia University Mountains situated in the northern portion of Alexander Island in Antarctica, and draining north-northwestwards between Mount Braun and Balan Ridge to flow into Palestrina Glacier.

The glacier is named after Yozola Lake in the Rila Mountain, Bulgaria.

Location
British mapping in 1963.

Maps
 British Antarctic Territory. Scale 1:200000 topographic map No. 3127. DOS 610 - W 69 70. Tolworth, UK, 1971.
 Antarctic Digital Database (ADD). Scale 1:250000 topographic map of Antarctica. Scientific Committee on Antarctic Research (SCAR), 1993–2016.

References
 Yozola Glacier. SCAR Composite Gazetteer of Antarctica.
 Bulgarian Antarctic Gazetteer. Antarctic Place-names Commission. (details in Bulgarian, basic data in English)

External links
 Yozola Glacier. Copernix satellite image

Glaciers of Alexander Island
Bulgaria and the Antarctic